The E-signal (Swedish: Ägovägssignal, lit. "owner's road signal") is a type of grade crossing signal used in Sweden on very low-traffic roads crossing a railroad track, when the same landowner owns the property on both sides of the railway track and only a few residential buildings can be reached from the road. An e-signal operates in the opposite fashion of a conventional grade crossing signal: it is lit when no train is approaching the crossing, and when a train approaches, it extinguishes approximately 30-60 seconds before the train's arrival. This is intended to provide a 'fail safe' function, in the event the signal bulb has blown or the power has failed; e-signal mountings are always supplemented with an information plate indicating the function of the signal. Due to its method of function, the e-signal is considered to be potentially confusing to drivers, and is being phased out of service; however, in Sweden there are still approximately 170 e-signals in operation.

United States 
The Monon Railroad used a similar signal on its lines throughout the state of Indiana. The device used a green light, usually made from a standard traffic signal, which always remained lit except when a train was present. The green light would then go dark, telling motorists to stop. A sign below or to the side of the signal read, "STOP When Signal Is Out" or "DANGER when light is out cross at your own risk". This design was fail-safe, in that when the signal bulb was burned out, an approaching vehicle driver would assume a train was coming — until they eventually realized there was no train and just a burned-out signal.

References

Railway safety
Railway signalling in Sweden
Level crossings